Kevin M. Dougherty (born May 19, 1962) is an associate justice of the Supreme Court of Pennsylvania. Before his election in 2015, Dougherty had served on the Pennsylvania Court of Common Pleas in Philadelphia since 2001, serving as an administrative judge of the trial division.

He had been appointed to the bench by Pennsylvania Governor Tom Ridge in 2001, and was elected to the first of two 10-year terms later that year, receiving the most vote among 14 candidates. After his election, he requested to be assigned to the family division, where he felt he could have the most significant societal impact, and has prided himself on helping families and children during his judicial career. Dougherty became Supervising Judge of the Juvenile Division of Philadelphia Family Court in 2003. There he implemented reforms like easing access to the court and what he called a "changing of the culture" among a judiciary of mostly older judges. He received 78 percent of the vote when he ran for retention in 2011, and received support from both Democrats and Republicans.

Dougherty graduated from the Antioch School of Law in Washington, D.C. in 1988, and is a graduate of Temple University. He ran as a Democrat for Pennsylvania Supreme Court in 2015, and was part of a Democratic sweep of all three court vacancies, along with David Wecht, and Christine Donohue. They defeated Republican candidates Judith Olsen, Michael George, and Anne Covey, in a campaign that saw more than $15 million in donations from special interests. Dougherty received a "recommended" rating from the Pennsylvania Bar Association, and received strong support from organized labor groups, in part due to Dougherty's relationship with his brother, indicted Philadelphia labor leader John J. "Johnny Doc" Dougherty.  Dougherty was the campaign's top fundraiser, raising more than $3.5 million.

Dougherty grew up in South Philadelphia in what he described as a "very blue-collar, working-class neighborhood", and was the first from his family to graduate college, working three part-time jobs as he attended Temple.

References

External links

Biography from "Kevin Dougherty for Supreme Court"

1962 births
Living people
David A. Clarke School of Law alumni
Judges of the Pennsylvania Courts of Common Pleas
Pennsylvania Democrats
Politicians from Philadelphia
Justices of the Supreme Court of Pennsylvania
Temple University alumni
21st-century American judges